Frank Dobson (1940–2019) is a British politician.

Frank Dobson may also refer to:

Frank Dobson (Australian politician) (1835–1895), member of the Victorian Legislative Council from 1865
Frank Dobson (American football) (1885–1959), American football coach
Frank Dobson (lichenologist) (died 2021), British lichenologist
Frank Dobson (sculptor) (1886–1963), British sculptor
Frank Dobson (sport shooter) (born 1934), British Olympic shooter